Devi Gharti Magar is Nepali folk singer. She was born in Ramuwa village of Baglung district Nepal. She married Raju Dhakal on 2008. She meet Dhakal on 2004 in Folk Duet program. She was elected as open central member of "Lok Dohori Pratisthan" (Folk Duet Academy) in 2019.

Awards

Her 2017 Panche baja song "Oralima Bar" was written by Sharad pandey and sung by Pandey and Devi Gharti Magar herself. In 2020 she along with Ramji Khand came up with the song "Dui mutuko bandhan". Same year she released the song "takine aaina".

Discography
Badala Barilai – solo
Banki Chari -with Arjun Sapkota
Ma Ta Aaune Thina Yehi Chal hola Vanya Bha – with Shirish Devkota
Lauri harayo – with Pashupati Sharma
Rudai Fulyo Makhmali – with Badri Pangeni
Syangja Hudai Baglung Bazara – with Raju Pariyar
Fulma Mauri Dulne Belama – with Raju Pariyar
Jimmal ba ko Aaganima – with Kulendra Bishwokarma
Uhi kholima paani – with Rajan Gurung
Hasna sikayeu – with Kulendra Bishwokarma
Najarai ko Bhara – with Shirish Devkota
Herna oi Batuli – with Pashupati Sharma
Jhalko lali oth ko – with Milan Lama
Gham bhanda ni junko – with Bishnu Khatri
Ke khanxeu kamala - with Parjapati Parajuli

References

External links
Official Website 
Facebook
Instagram

Nepalese folk singers
Living people
People from Baglung District
21st-century Nepalese women singers
1986 births
Dohori singers